Penthorum chinense, commonly known as Oriental penthorum, is a plant species native to much of East Asia. It has been reported from China, Korea, Japan, Mongolia, Russia, Vietnam, Laos and Thailand. It is one of only two species in the genus, the other being Penthorum sedoides, native to the United States and Canada.

Penthorum chinense is a perennial herb up to 90 cm (35 inches) tall, spreading by underground rhizomes. Aerial stems are usually unbranched, with lanceolate leaves up to 10 cm (4 inches) long. Flowers are yellow, borne in a cyme at the top of the stem.

References

Saxifragales
Flora of China
Flora of Russia
Flora of Korea
Flora of Mongolia
Flora of Japan
Flora of Indo-China